"If I Could" is a single from English rapper Wiley, featuring vocals from British singer-songwriter Ed Sheeran. It is the second single released from his extended-play album, Chill Out Zone. It was released on 15 May 2011 as a digital download in the United Kingdom. The music video was uploaded to YouTube on 1 May 2011. It was shot in Kingston, Jamaica and was directed by Ben Peters.

Track listing
 Digital download
 "If I Could" – 3:07

Credits and personnel 
 Lead vocals – Wiley, Ed Sheeran
 Producer – Jay Weathers
 Lyrics – Richard Cowie, Ed Sheeran
 Label – Elusive

Chart performance

Release history

References 

Wiley (musician) songs
Ed Sheeran songs
Songs written by Ed Sheeran
2011 singles